Peter Christian Kierkegaard (6 July 1805 – 24 February 1888), was a Danish theologian, politician and Bishop of Diocese of Aalborg from 1857 until 1875.

Early life
He was born at Aalborg, Denmark as the son of Michael Pedersen Kierkegaard (1756-1838) and his second wife  Ane Sørensdatter Lund (1768–1834). His father was a wealthy wool farmer and real estate speculator. One of seven children, Peter Kierkegaard was the elder brother of theologian and philosopher Søren Kierkegaard (1813-1855). In 1822 he graduated from the University of Copenhagen and in 1826 he became cand.theol.
   
In 1829 defended his dissertation at the university of Göttingen. He subsequently conducted a study trip to Bonn, Utrecht, Leuven (Louvain) and Paris. The following years he supported himself by teaching classical languages at the Borgerdydskolen in Copenhagen.

Career
In 1833, he was appointed parish priest at Vejerslev-Blidstrup in Morsø Municipality. From 1842, he was parish priest for Pedersborg and Kindertofte at Sorø. In 1856 he was appointed Bishop of the Diocese of Aalborg.

As a theologian of the official Church of Denmark, he had on several occasions criticized his brother's works, notably at the synod conventions at Roskilde in 1849 and 1855. However, he later delivered the eulogy for his brother at Vor Frue Kirke.

He was elected to the Landsting in December 1849. From 4 September 1867 until 6 March 1868, he was Kultus Minister of Denmark in the Frijs Cabinet.

Personal life
In 1836, Kierkegaard married Elise Marie Boisen (1806-1837) who died childless the following year. In 1841, he  married Sophie Henriette Glahn (1809-1881). They had one child, Pascal Poul Egede Kierkegaard (1842-1915).

Death
He died at Aalborg during 1888 and was buried in Almen Kirkegård. He was 82.

References

Sources
 Kirmmse, Bruce H.. Encounters with Kierkegaard: A Life as Seen by His Contemporaries, Princeton University Press, 1996, .
 Kierkegaard, Peter Christian. Samlede skrifter. København, K. Schønberg, 1902–1905.
 Kierkegaard, Peter Christian. Exstaticus. Søren Kierkegaards sidste Kamp, derunder hans Forhold til Broderen. (Peter Christian Kierkegaards Foredrag i Roskilde Konvent 5. Juli 1855, gengivet af ham selv). Ved Otto Holmgaard. København, Nyt Nordisk Forlag, 1967.

1805 births
1888 deaths
19th-century Lutheran bishops
Danish Kultus Ministers
Danish Lutheran theologians
19th-century Protestant theologians
Members of the Landsting (Denmark)
Danish male writers
Christian writers
Politicians from Aalborg
Søren Kierkegaard
Danish Lutheran bishops
University of Copenhagen alumni